West Pentire (meaning promontory) is a hamlet on the north coast of Cornwall in England, United Kingdom.

To the west of the hamlet are the West Pentire Fields, which have been designated as an Important Plant Area, by the organisation Plantlife, for its arable flora, especially poppies and corn marigolds. These fields are owned by the National Trust.

References

Hamlets in Cornwall
Populated coastal places in Cornwall
National Trust properties in Cornwall